Arkadiusz Marchewka (born 18 January 1986)) is a Polish politician, member of Sejm of the 8th and 9th legislature.

Early life and education 
Arkadiusz Marchewka was born in 1986 in Szczecin. He graduated International Relations at the University of Szczecin in 2010 and in 2009 Management at the Faculty of Economics of the West Pomeranian University of Technology. At the University of Szczecin, based on the Oddziaływanie bezpośrednich inwestycji zagranicznych na rynek pracy województwa zachodniopomorskiego, he obtained a PhD of economics.

Political career 
He became involved in political activities within the framework of the Civic Platform. In 2007, he was elected to the Niebuszewo estate council. He was an assistant to the deputy marshal of the West Pomeranian Voivodeship– Witold Jabłoński, then employed in the marshal's office. Later, he started working as a manager in the Polskie Terminale company.

In 2010 and 2014, he was elected to the Szczecin City Council. He was the vice-president of the city council.

Parliamentarian 
In the parliamentary election in 2015, he ran for the Sejm mandate from the Civic Platform list. He obtained the mandate of the MP of the 8th legislature, receiving 7147 votes. In the Sejm of the 8th legislature, he became a member of the Committee on Economy and Development, the Committee on Maritime Economy and Inland Navigation as well as the Committee on Digitization, Innovation and Modern Technologies. In April 2018, he became the president of the Civic Platform structures in the West Pomeranian Voivodeship.

In the elections in 2019, he successfully applied for a parliamentary reelection, from Civic Coalition list, receiving 30 047 votes. In the Sejm of the 9th legislature he became vice-chairman of the Maritime Economy and Inland Navigation Committee, member of the Digitization, Innovation and Modern Technologies Committee and Public Finance Committee, vice-chairman of the Polish-Swedish Parliamentary Group and chairman of the West Pomeranian Parliamentary Team

References 

Civic Platform politicians
1986 births
Politicians from Szczecin
University of Szczecin alumni
Members of the Polish Sejm 2015–2019
Members of the Polish Sejm 2019–2023
Living people